Al Sellinger (July 6, 1914 – April 15, 1986) was an American cyclist. He competed in three events at the 1936 Summer Olympics.

References

1914 births
1986 deaths
American male cyclists
Olympic cyclists of the United States
Cyclists at the 1936 Summer Olympics
Sportspeople from Newark, New Jersey